Trevor Hitchen (born 25 September 1926) is an English former footballer who played in The Football League for Southport and Oldham Athletic. He was also appointed as player-manager at Wigan Athletic, scoring seven goals in 37 Lancashire Combination games during the 1957–58 season. He finished his career at Formby, where he later became chairman. In September 2019, on his 93rd birthday, it was announced that he would be inducted into the Southport F.C. Hall of Fame.

References

External links
 Career statistics

1926 births
Living people
People from Sowerby Bridge
English footballers
Association football wing halves
Halifax Town A.F.C. players
Notts County F.C. players
Telford United F.C. players
Southport F.C. players
Oldham Athletic A.F.C. players
Wigan Athletic F.C. players
Formby F.C. players
English Football League players
English football managers
Wigan Athletic F.C. managers
Southport F.C. managers
English Football League managers